Malabar Princess is a 2004 French film directed by Gilles Legrand. The film is about a young boy called Tom, who is sent to live with his grandfather in the French Alps after his mother disappeared during an excursion with her husband, Pierre, in the French Alps. He becomes friends with Benoît, a boy about his age. While searching for Tom's mother they come across the remains of a plane that had crashed during the 1950s.

Plot
Tom is eight and dyslexic, has  been living near Mont Blanc with his maternal grandfather, a tram conductor. He becomes friends with Benoît, and the two search for the remains of the Malabar Princess, an Air India plane that crashed in 1950.

Production
The film was shot on location at Mont Blanc in France. The Malabar Princess disaster actually occurred on 3 November 1950. It was Flight 245, a Lockheed Constellation aircraft of Air India, which had crashed at 4,700 meters above sea level. One of the engines of the wreckage was found on 15 September 1989 on the surface of the Glacier des Bossons, 1,900 m above sea level. A second engine was found on 22 September 2008 at 2,000 m above sea level on the same glacier.

Cast
 Jacques Villeret as Gaspard
 Michèle Laroque as Valentine
 Claude Brasseur as Robert
 Jules Angelo Bigarnet as Tom
 Clovis Cornillac as Pierre
 Urbain Cancelier as Gaston
 Fabienne Chaudat as Odette
 Damien Jouillerot as Benoît
 George Claisse as Guardian of the Sanctuary
 Roland Marchisio as The jeweler
 Patrick Ligardes as Constable Petit
 Franck Adrien as Constable Chopper

References

External links
 

2004 films
2000s French-language films
French drama films
French aviation films
2004 drama films
Films directed by Gilles Legrand
2000s French films